St Andrew's Priory was a Cluniac house in Northampton, England.

The priory was founded between 1093 and 1100 by Simon de Senlis, Earl of Northampton and his wife Maud.  A sister house for Cluniac nuns, Delapré Abbey, was founded to the south of the town by their son Simon II de Senlis, Earl of Huntingdon-Northampton. St Andrew's was initially an alien house, dependent on the French La Charité, but it was independent from 1405.

It was located in the north-west corner of the walled town of Northampton and was surrounded by a precinct wall. Maps of 1610 and 1632 suggest that the church lay to the north of Lower Priory Street and the gatehouse north of Grafton Street.

The Scottish Franciscan philosopher and theologian John Duns (commonly known as Dun Scotus) was ordained into the priesthood at St Andrew's on 17 March 1291.

The priory was surrendered on 2 March 1538 to Dr Richard Layton; he reported that the house was greatly in debt and the walls ruinous. The last prior, Francis Abree (alias Francis Leycester) became the first dean of the newly established diocese of Peterborough.

The site of the priory was built over in the 19th century. The Roman Catholic Northampton Cathedral was erected on land bought in 1823; the first Catholic chapel of St Andrews was built using stone found on the site.

Burials
Simon II de Senlis, Earl of Huntingdon-Northampton
Simon III de Senlis
Lochlann of Galloway
Ralph Ogle, 3rd Baron Ogle

See also
Cluniac priories in Britain

References

Cluniac monasteries in England
Christianity in Northampton